Institutions named (or formerly named) Hospital for Sick Children include:

 The Hospital for Sick Children (Toronto), a children's and teaching hospital in Canada
 Victoria Hospital for Sick Children, Toronto, a former hospital 
 Great Ormond Street Hospital, London
 Evelina London Children's Hospital, London 
 Royal Hospital for Children, Glasgow, Scotland
 Royal Hospital for Sick Children, Edinburgh, Scotland 
 Royal Belfast Hospital for Sick Children, Northern Ireland 
 Bristol Royal Hospital for Children, England 
 Royal Alexandra Children's Hospital, Brighton, England 
 Royal Alexandra Hospital for Children, Sydney, Australia
 Our Lady's Children's Hospital, Crumlin, Dublin, Ireland

See also
 Children's hospital, the type of institution